The article lists China's province-level divisions by gross domestic product (GDP). Each province's GDP is listed in both the national currency renminbi (CN¥), and at nominal U.S. dollar values according to annual average exchange rates.

Map

2022

Appendix 
GDP figures for Hong Kong and Macau SARs are given in both US dollars and in their respective local currencies (Hong Kong dollars and Macanese patacas). PPP figures are given in Int'l. dollars .

See also 

 Economy of China
 Historical GDP of China
 List of Chinese administrative divisions by GDP per capita
 List of Chinese prefecture-level cities by GDP

 List of Chinese prefecture-level cities by GDP per capita
 List of renminbi exchange rates

Notes
This is a list of the first-level administrative divisions of Mainland China (including all provinces, autonomous regions, and municipalities) in order of their total gross domestic product.

References 

GDP
GDP
GDP
Chinese administrative divisions by GDP
Economy of China by province
Economy of China-related lists
China, GDP